St Anthony of Padua Church is a Roman Catholic parish church in Mossley Hill, Liverpool. It was built from 1931 to 1932 by the Franciscan Order of Friars Minor Conventual. It is located on Queens Drive opposite Liverpool College. The church was one of the first started by the friars coming from New York in the re-establishment of the Conventual Friars in England after the Reformation.

History

Foundation
In 1906, the Order of Friars Minor Conventual, the Conventual Franciscan friars came to England. Two Maltese friars, Fr Bonaventure Sceberras and Fr Roger Azzopardi started a mission in Portishead, Somerset that became St Joseph's Church. In 1910, the friars started St Anthony of Padua Church, Rye in East Sussex. In 1926, friars came from Syracuse, New York to Mossley Hill in Liverpool. The site of the church was bought from Liverpool City Council and the adjacent Elmsley House was bought to be a friary and parish hall.

Construction
On 7 November 1926, a temporary church was opened by the Archbishop of Liverpool Frederick Keating. In 1931, building work started on St Anthony of Padua Church. In 1932, the church was opened and consecrated. The architect was Anthony Ellis and the cost of the church was £16,500. In the construction of the church, the friars told Ellis to use the same basilica plan as Assumption Church in Syracuse. Assumption Church was built in 1859 and is the mother church of the Conventual Franciscans in the northeast United States.

Developments
In 1933, an organ was installed in St Anthony of Padua Church, it came from the German Church on Renshaw Street in Liverpool.  From 1947 to 1955, the friary was a novitiate for the Conventual Friars in Britain. In the 1950s, a marble reredos and painted murals were added. From 1962 to 1963, the murals were replaced by ones painted Giuseppe Lerario, which depict Our Lady of the Immaculate Conception, the pope and bishops of the Second Vatican Council as well as murals of St Anthony of Padua and St Francis of Assisi.

Parish
The friars continue to serve the parish. There are four Sunday Masses in the church at 6:00pm on Saturday and at 9:30am,11:00 am and 6:00 pm on Sunday.

Church and friary

See also
 Archdiocese of Liverpool

References

External links
 
 Liverpool South Pastoral Area
 St. Anthony of Padua - Mossley Hill, Liverpool from TheGreyFriars.org
 St Anthony of Padua from Archdiocese of Liverpool

Roman Catholic churches in Liverpool
Romanesque Revival church buildings in England
1926 establishments in England
Roman Catholic churches completed in 1932
20th-century Roman Catholic church buildings in the United Kingdom
Conventual Franciscan churches in the United Kingdom